Kharkhni is a rural locality (a selo) in Dzhuldzhagsky Selsoviet, Tabasaransky District, Republic of Dagestan, Russia. The population was 99 as of 2010.

Geography 
Kharkhni is located 12 km west of Khuchni (the district's administrative centre) by road. Dzhuldzhag, Churdaf and Gasik are the nearest rural localities.

References 

Rural localities in Tabasaransky District